Roberto García Morillo (January 22, 1911 – October 26, 2003) was an Argentine composer, musicologist, music professor and music critic.

Biography
García Morillo was born in Buenos Aires, Argentina, where he studied at the Conservatorio Nacional de Música "Carlos López Buchardo" (with José André, Floro M. Ugarte, José Gil, and Constantino Gaito), and in Paris studied piano with Yves Nat . Morillo died on October 26, 2003.

He worked as a music critic for the newspaper La Nación starting in 1938, and subsequently published in many Argentine and North American periodicals. He was appointed to joint positions as professor of composition in both the national and the municipal conservatories in Buenos Aires in 1942 .

Curriculum:
Director of the Conservatorio Nacional de Música "Carlos López Buchardo" (1972–79)
Professor of Composition at the Conservatorio Municipal de Música and at the Antiguo Conservatorio "Beethoven"
Music critic of the newspaper La Nación (1938–79)
Member of the Comisión de Música Sinfónica y de Cámara de SADAIC
Vicepresident of the Asociación Argentina de Compositores (AAC)
President of the Unión Compositores de la Argentina (CUDA)
Member of the Senato Académico del Centro Internazionale di Studi Musicali (Rome), Sociedad Internacional de Musicología and Internationale Gesellschaft für Urheberrecht (INTERCU) of Munich
Jury member of several national and international competitions (Rio de Janeiro, Taormina, Montevideo, etc.).

Morillo's pupils included Regina Benavente

Works
His compositional style was never nationalistic, though most of his works from 1939 onward display the influence of Spanish culture . He received awards from the Comisión Nacional de Cultura, Municipalidad de la Ciudad de Buenos Aires, Asociación Wagneriana, SADAIC, Rotary Club, and the Dante Alighieri Scholarship (1952).

His works have been commissioned by: 
Radio Nacional Argentina
Asociación de Conciertos de Cámara
Asociación Amigos de la Música
Festival de Música de Tucumán
Asociación "El Piano"
Asociación Argentina de Compositores (AAC)
Fabien Scvitzky (Tchaikowsky Festival, 1959)
Municipalidad de la Ciudad de Buenos Aires
Teatro Colón
Yacimientos Petrolíferos Fiscales (YOF)
Asociación Amigos del Coro Nacional de Niños
IV Festival Interamericano de Música (Washington).

References

Sources

 

Argentine classical composers
1911 births
2003 deaths
Male classical composers
Musicians from Buenos Aires
Burials at La Chacarita Cemetery
20th-century Argentine artists
21st-century Argentine artists
20th-century classical composers
21st-century classical composers
20th-century male musicians
21st-century male musicians